Caine's Arcade is an 11-minute short documentary film by Nirvan Mullick released on April 9, 2012 that features a cardboard arcade created by then 9-year-old Caine Monroy out of boxes and everyday objects. The boy ran his arcade from his father's auto parts store in East Los Angeles mid-2011. Nirvan was inspired to make the documentary after unexpectedly coming across the arcade while getting a door handle for his car. Nirvan became Caine's first customer, purchasing a $2 Fun Pass, and decided to make a film about Caine's Arcade after witnessing the level of commitment, work, and thought Caine had put into the arcade. After learning he had been Caine's first and only customer, Nirvan used social media to arrange a surprise flash mob of customers to come to play Caine's Arcade, which was included in the film.

After being uploaded on YouTube, the short film soon became a viral video, and numerous people donated money towards a college fund that Nirvan had established for Caine. Since the film's release, schools around the world have recreated similar cardboard arcades, and the positive response inspired Nirvan and the team to start the Imagination Foundation, a non-profit aimed at fostering creativity and entrepreneurship in adults across the world.

Background
Before 2011, Caine had spent weekends with his father George Monroy at the store, during which he had tried selling goods, including yard signs for supporting sports teams and snacks and drinks from vending machines. Caine found little success with his ventures. George's store was in an industrial area of East Los Angeles with little foot traffic, and his store was more a physical warehouse for sales made over the Internet. In summer 2011, Caine found many of the discarded boxes from the store and asked for his father's permission to create the arcade in the front, which George supported. Caine built and designed all the games himself, creating a ticket and prize redemption system, originally using some of his old toys such as Hot Wheels cars and then into items bought at dollar stores as prizes. Caine would operate the arcade "machines", retrieving balls and dispensing tickets to the player. During a family vacation to Palm Springs, Caine had asked for a t-shirt, with "Caine's Arcade" on one side and "Staff" on the other to be made for him, despite not knowing what "staff" meant at the time but knowing that he had seen that word used in other places.

Because of the store's location along an industrial street, Caine's arcade had no customers until Nirvan, who needed a new door handle for his '96 Corolla, went to George's shop. While there, he saw the arcade and asked Caine about it. Nirvan was particularly impressed with some of the basic business fundamentals that Caine implemented, such as offering a $2 "Fun Pass" that offered 500 plays of the games, compared to the four plays one would receive for one dollar. Nirvan proceeded to buy a fun pass and play the games, unaware that he was Caine's first customer, only learning this after speaking later with George, who had said that even one customer made Caine happy.

Documentary
After playing Caine's Arcade, Nirvan returned a few weeks later to ask Caine's father George Monroy for permission to make a short film about Caine's Arcade to premiere at DIY Days at UCLA at the end of October. Caine's father approved of the idea, and shared that Nirvan had been Caine's first and only customer. After learning this, Nirvan decided to organize a surprise flash mob of customers for Caine as part of the film. The flash mob was set for October 2, 2011, and spread via Facebook and Reddit. On the day of the flash mob, George arranged to take Caine out for pizza in the afternoon, giving the crowd of over one hundred time to gather and construct signs. When Caine returned, the crowd cheered "we came to play" - Caine was surprised and elated when he realized the crowd was there for him, saying that at first he thought he was "dreaming", but then he realized "it was real life- they were really playing the games." Nirvan worked to prepare a 14-minute rough cut of the documentary, which premiered at UCLA's DIY Days event at the end of October, 2011. Caine was in attendance, and set up his arcade. The film includes an original song 'Caine's Arcade" by local songwriter Juli Crockett and a song from actor Ryan Gosling's band Dead Man's Bones.

Nirvan released the final 11-minute documentary to the video site Vimeo and YouTube on April 9, 2012, and shared links on popular sites including Reddit and Boing Boing. The documentary soon propagated in viral video fashion, with over 1 million views the first day, and more than 5 million views within the first five days. In addition to numerous responses, several emotional video responses were received, as the film "made grown men cry."

Nirvan is exploring making the short documentary into a feature film after completing other projects related the short film's success and influence; Nirvan has stated that he has received offers from film publishers to create the feature-length film.

Impact
Following the release of the documentary, Caine was invited to speak at the USC Marshall School of Business, the youngest entrepreneur to speak there. Caine was also the youngest speaker at the Cannes Lions International Advertising Festival. The Massachusetts Institute of Technology invited Caine to participate in a summer program, while the University of California Los Angeles has offered to help design a course curriculum for Caine when he is ready to attend college. Business journals such as Forbes and Fast Company have highlighted the factors that made Caine's arcade work that can be applied to any developing business, such as Caine's perseverance and optimism. The arcade was temporarily displayed in the Exploratorium in San Francisco. Caine continued to operate the arcade on Saturdays to a steady stream of guests for 18 months after the documentary's release, eventually "retiring" from running his arcade on his 11th birthday. While open, nearby businesses and local musicians worked to create a street fair-like environment around the arcade on the days that it is open. Caine was offered a full-scholarship to attend Colorado State University after Nirvan and Caine spoke in Denver at the 2013 Colorado Innovation Network Summit.

Nirvan established a college fund for Caine to which viewers could contribute, with an initial goal of $25,000, but this was quickly surpassed, raising over $60,000 on the first day, and exceeded $170,000 a week following. The total fund has raised over $240,000, with an ultimate goal of $250,000. With a matching grant from the Goldhirsh Foundation, Nirvan started the Imagination Foundation, a non-profit with a mission to find, foster, and fund creativity and entrepreneurship in children. Nirvan had not originally planned on this, though had been working in non-profit foundations before, but after three days of the video's release and the donations to Caine's college fund, he began working out the mission statement for the Imagination Foundation. Nirvan launched the non-profit by making a follow-up film, "Caine's Arcade 2" - which launched the Imagination Foundation and a Global Cardboard Challenge, culminating in a Day of Play (celebrating the anniversary of the surprise flashmob from Caine's Arcade); as of 2017, over 750,000 kids in 80 countries have taken part in the Global Cardboard Challenge. Nirvan has become an inspirational speaker, sharing the story with educators and business leaders around the world.

Nirvan has begun receiving positive feedback from parents and teachers shortly after the release of the video, including photos and videos of cardboard arcade games created by children inspired by Caine's Arcade; one such clip included actor-musician Jack Black and his children. From this, Nirvan and team worked with volunteer teachers to create an open-ended curriculum allowing students to create something that they enjoy in the same manner that Caine approached his arcade with. In September 2012, nearing the first anniversary of the surprise flash mob event, Nirvan released a second video, Caine's Arcade 2, which primarily was a montage of these video clips. As a means of launching the Imagination Foundation, Nirvan arranged the Global Cardboard Challenge, to encourage creativity with cardboard - 3 weeks after the follow-up film, volunteers organized over 270 Cardboard Challenge events across 41 countries, including one at Caine's Arcade in Boyle Heights. The event was popular, and became an annual event, with initial sponsorship from Mattress Firm, who learned of the story after Nirvan and Caine spoke at a Mattress Firm event.

Two years after its opening, Caine 'retired' from running his arcade, partially as he was entering junior high school, but also to start a new business of a bicycle shop to help repair and remake existing bicycles.

The Imagination.org and the Global Cardboard Challenge have continued to grow, adding Imagination Chapters in 2014 and an Inventors Challenge in 2016.

References

External links
 
 Imagination Foundation
 

2012 films
2012 short documentary films
American short documentary films
Internet documentary films
Documentary films about children
Documentary films about Los Angeles
2010s American films